The Apprentice 4 is the fourth season of The Apprentice, with Donald Trump as the executive producer and host. The show was aired on Thursday nights at 9 p.m. on NBC and started September 22, 2005.

This was the first season of the show not to place in the Top 20 Nielsen Ratings; it averaged #38 with 11.01 million viewers.

Starting with this season, frequent boardroom adviser George H. Ross began to lessen his involvement with the show, with The Apprentice first season winner Bill Rancic effectively sharing the role with him throughout this and the following season.

Candidates
Unhappy with both the choice of candidates and the "street smarts" vs. "book smarts" premise from the preceding season, Trump went to the auditions and hand-picked 17 of the 18 candidates in season 4. In addition to candidate handpicking, Trump decided to go back to the premise of men versus women (there was eventually corporate restructuring). The all-women team named their corporation Capital Edge while the all-men team named their corporation Excel.

The winning project manager, throughout the season, may be exempt from firing for the following week only if the majority of the other members in their team believed he/she did a satisfactory job. In the previous two seasons, the winning project manager would automatically be exempt from firing. The season had 3 episodes end with multiple firings, 2 of them were double firings, and one was a quadruple firing.

Weekly results

 The candidate was on the losing team.
 The candidate was hired and won the competition.
 The candidate won as project manager on his/her team.
 The candidate lost as project manager on his/her team.
 The candidate was brought to the final boardroom.
 The candidate was fired.
 The candidate lost as project manager and was fired.

Episodes

Week 1: Let's Get Physical
Air date: September 22, 2005
Sponsor: Bally Total Fitness
Project: Teams had to create and promote a workout class for Bally Total Fitness. The team that generates the most renevue of profit wins.
Judges: Donald Trump; Carolyn Kepcher; George H. Ross
Trump Monologue Can't We All Get Along - It is a lot harder to be successful if you can't work with people.
Capital Edge project manager: Kristi
Excel project manager: Markus
Winning team: Excel
Team's profit: $527
Reason for win: Markus executed the key strategy of offering a lower cost & deluxe packages, which increased sales and was key to the victory.  Excel had a better location than Capital Edge and focused their efforts on Bally's existing customers, taking advantage of the captive audience.
Exemption: In a new twist, the winning team would have to vote if their project manager would be exempt from being fired. When Trump asked if Markus (the winning project manager) should be exempt, only Adam and Randal voted yes, which was not a majority vote and did not grant Markus immunity from the next firing.
Excel's reward: Friar's Club lunch with Donald Trump.
Losing team: Capital Edge
Team's profit: $516
Reasons for loss: Even though they had lost by only $11 and had an outstanding choreographied-class, Kristi's idea for the marketing flyer was awful. The flyer that came out from the graphic designer had read "Triple XXX Threat", and alluded to pornography that felt like it was a "strip club".
Task tension: Melissa clashed into the women by strategizing the marketing that 98% of the demographics was Hispanic that could easily pay $10–15.
Initial boardroom: A majority of Capital Edge said that Melissa was very negative, dramatic, and obnoxious.  Melissa points out that she doesn't work well with women, which infuriated Trump and his advisors. But she acknowledged that she let Kristi get under her skin  and reminded Trump that her insubordination was not why they lost the task, and that Kristi was mainly responsible, due to her shoddy leadership and the poorly made marketing flyer.
Sent to boardroom: Kristi and Melissa
Fired: Melissa Holovach – for being an incredibly disruptive force, not getting along with the team, and for not being able to work with women.
Notes:
 After splitting the candidates into the two teams, Trump offered a reward to the first person to reach his helicopter, which was on the other side of the golf course. The winner's team would be granted the use of the helicopter for the duration of the task. Mark, from Excel, reached the helicopter first.
This is the first time that an all-male team won the first task and the first time that the eventual winner won the first task.
Josh said that the men did not intend to grant any winning project manager immunity during the course of the season, as they felt that no candidate could single-handedly be responsible for a team's victory. Ultimately however, every other victorious project manager this season (apart from Clay in Week 8) would be voted to receive immunity by their teammates, and it was clear in retrospect the men denied Markus the immunity because they didn't like him and weren't willing to give him any tangible credit for "leading" them to a victory.
Kristi asks if she could bring only one person back into the boardroom. Trump complied, making it the first time in Apprentice history that only one candidate was brought back, when they had the option to bring back two. This would not be the only time, as future candidates would also only bring back one person to the boardroom in this season.
Melissa's firing marked the first time that a female competitor was the first person to be fired from the show. All previous seasons featured a man being the first one fired.
After Melissa's elimination, Kristi made a smug smirk and Trump immediately chastised her for it, saying she had "nothing to be proud of".
Melissa virtually destroyed her chances of being hired by Trump and continuing on the show when she admitted (repeatedly) that she can not get along with women. She also added that women generally dislike her because they feel threatened or intimidated by her beauty and intelligence, which did not impress Trump or his advisors.
Melissa later appeared on a Dr. Phil episode where she continued to blame Kristi for her firing (though she didn't refer to Kristi by name) before conceding that she hadn't done a good job and needed to look more closely at herself for that.
During the filming of the first task, Randal was told that his grandmother had died. After announcing Excel's win, Trump gave Randal the opportunity to leave the show. Randal declined, saying he felt that his grandmother would have wanted him to stay on the show. During the filming of episode 2, Trump allowed Randal to borrow his helicopter and attend the funeral.
Episode 1 Recap from NBC.com

Week 2: There's No Little "i" in Team
Air date: September 29, 2005
Sponsor: Lamborghini
Project: Teams had to create an advertising campaign for Lamborghini cars.
Judges: Donald Trump; Carolyn Kepcher; George H. Ross
Trump Monologue Be Flexible In business it is important to adapt, and if you don't adapt you are never going to be good in business and you are never going to be successful. Show flexibility, be able to make a change.
Capital Edge project manager: Marshawn
Excel project manager: Chris
Winning team: Capital Edge
Reasons for victory: Their campaign was very strong overall and had no significant weaknesses, and the Lamborghini executives particularly liked the fact that their campaign conveyed the message through images and emotion alone, without needing too much text. They also liked their advertisement, presentation, and the video.
Exemption: All of Capital Edge (with the exception of Kristi) voted to have Marshawn exempt from being fired in Week 3.
Capital Edge's reward: Hockey with New York Islanders legends and prospects.
 At the reward, Rebecca fell and broke her ankle.
Losing team: Excel
Reasons for loss: Despite that both teams had solid & outstanding video adverts, the executive felt the men wasn't as strong than the women by having the presentation too wordy and felt that Excel had made critical errors by making their marketing materials too verbose. On top of that, grammatical errors were spotted on the team's printed ad posters; one ad read "Green With Envy" felt that it was confusing whilst Markus tried to inform his team it should have read "Green With Envy?". With the second ad, the executives didn't like the fact that the Italian on "Rebirth of Italian Intimidation" had a lowercase "i" on their ad.
Sent to boardroom: Chris and Markus
Firing verdict: Prior to Chris choosing only Markus back to the boardroom, Trump made it clear that Chris should bring Mark into the boardroom, because Mark was responsible for the bad grammar on the ads. Chris took the blame for Mark's mistake, saying he believed in Mark and when Mark failed, he failed too.
Fired: Chris Valletta – for producing a mediocre ad-poster especially presentation, allowing his emotions to influence his decision-making after bringing in Markus back to the boardroom and for essentially being responsible for the loss after not bringing in Mark instead.
Notes:
Chris was adamant about getting Markus fired, claiming that he disrupted the team's unity. Even though several other members of Excel wanted Markus gone as well (Josh and Clay in particular), Trump and his advisors reminded them that Markus was not responsible for losing the task, and he even had the correct idea for one of their ads.  
Trump and his advisors saw potential in Chris, but they did not like the fact that he deliberately brought back Markus and not Mark, after Trump clearly stated not to do so otherwise; Carolyn in particular said that she would have kept Chris over Mark without a second thought, had both been in the final boardroom. Chris had also brought back Markus alone, which did not statistically improve his chances of not being fired.
After being fired, Trump told Chris that he thought Chris had great potential, and then warned Markus that he would not last long, to which Markus replied "I'll prove you wrong". Markus would go on to be fired the next time he lost a task.
In his exit interview, Chris continued to bad-mouth Markus. He claimed "Markus didn't even have his hands on the paddle, was facing the opposite direction drinking a martini talking to the captain." talking as if the team was on a boat and saying Markus was "the one guy not paddling"
In the middle of the task, Randal left to attend his grandmother's funeral. He arrived back at the agency as Excel was getting ready to present their advertising campaign to Lamborghini.
The little "i" in the episode's title refers to the error in Excel's advertising. Mark thought that using the small "i" in "Rebirth of Italian Intimidation" to match the small "i's" in Lamborghini would have looked better.
Because of the NHL lockout taking place during filming of this task, the reward only involved Islanders legends and prospects.  Active players were not eligible to participate in the reward because of the lockout not having been settled at the time of taping.
Markus pitched the slogan "Smooth As Silk", as part of a visual package. A Lamborghini executive rejected it outright. Although not mentioned during the episode, it happens that this slogan was already in use by Thai Airways International for over 30 years.
This is the first time in The Apprentice history when only two candidates were pulled into the final boardroom for two consecutive weeks, when the project manager had the option to bring in two or three candidates.
Episode 2 Recap from NBC.com

Week 3: Something Old, Something New
Air date: October 6, 2005
Sponsor: Best Buy Geek Squad
Project: Excel and Capital Edge were both given space at the Cedar Crest Village Home in Pompton Plains, New Jersey to host a technology expo for the senior citizens. All the equipment was purchased at Best Buy using the allotted Best Buy gift cards.
Judges: Donald Trump; Carolyn Kepcher; George H. Ross
Trump Monologue Inspire Leadership is very important in business, you have to really make them respect you. Hilariously the monologue shows footage of Trump motivating one of his lawyer by flaunting Jennifer Hawkins Miss Universe 2004 in-front of him. It was out of context and exactly how she was inspiring was not elaborated.
Capital Edge project manager: Rebecca
Excel project manager: Randal
Task tension: While the task generally ran much smoother than the two previous ones, there were still minor issues on both teams. On Excel, Clay attempted to shoot down every idea that Markus came up with (despite the other men agreeing that this time they were actually good ideas), and then unwittingly offended George by asking him to back up his claim that older people are fixed in their habits, and unwilling to learn. Meanwhile, on Capital Edge most of the women felt that Rebecca was an abrasive leader and a poor motivator.
Winning team: Excel
Reason for victory: The men created a lot of buzz around their expo, and focused on demonstrations that would be easy to follow and would allow the senior citizens to interact with the new technology. In spite of Clay's concerns, Markus excelled in the role of explaining the complicated TIVO system to the senior citizens proving to be a major factor in Excel scoring an average rating of 8.1 from the attendees.
Exemption: Excel voted unanimously to have Randal exempt from firing for Week 4.
Excel's reward: Handing out toys to children at a hospital.
Losing team: Capital Edge
Reasons for loss: Although the technology demonstrations were generally okay (with the notable exception of Toral, who got completely lost while trying to demonstrate a TV), the team was let down badly by Jennifer W's poor organization and decoration of the event, which looked bare and uninviting. Capital Edge's expo was rated at 7.9 by the attendees.
Sent to boardroom: Rebecca, Jennifer M., and Jennifer W., in spite of the team's criticisms and a strong suggestion by Trump for Toral to be brought back.
Boardroom Verdict: Trump disagreed with Rebecca's decision to not bring Toral back, as well as her decision to bring in Jennifer M. for the boardroom; however, he felt that Rebecca had potential. Rebecca also strongly defended Toral to the point where Trump allowed Toral one last chance to prove herself. Carolyn found Capital Edge's presentation boring, dull and drab and was also the one to point out to Jennifer W. that instead of the cake saying "Techno Expo", it read "Tethno Expo". Jennifer W. was exposed to be primarily liable for the refreshments and the decorations, prompting Trump to find Jennifer W. to ultimately be liable for the loss.
Fired: Jennifer Wallen – for being the most accountable to her team's failure due to her lackluster event planning.
Notes:
Rebecca started out the episode on crutches after breaking her ankle during the reward from the previous task.
When asked if Markus was the weakest member on Excel again, the men defended him and noted his improvement, impressing Trump.
After the candidates had left the boardroom, referring to Rebecca, Trump told Carolyn and George, "This girl's either gonna be great or a disaster."
In her exit interview, Jennifer W. claimed she is a great event planner.
Episode 3 Recap from NBC.com

Week 4: Ice Cream of Genie
Airdate: October 13, 2005
Sponsor: Dairy Queen
Project: Teams had to create a new promotional character for the Dairy Queen Blizzard Treat. The winning team will be judged based on the executive's decision.
Judges: Donald Trump; Carolyn Kepcher; George H. Ross
Trump Monologue Maximize Potential A good leader has to be able to recognize the strengths and weaknesses of employees. The leader has to see who is really strong and where.
Capital Edge project manager: Felisha
Excel project manager: Clay
Winning team: Excel
Reasons for victory: The team incorporated both the Dairy Queen logo and ice cream into their character. The executives felt it should have had a little more in the way of Blizzard Treat-specific features, but the finished product was still far more suitable than Capital Edge's effort.
Exemption: All of Excel voted for Clay to be exempt from firing in week 5 before the reward was announced
Excel's reward: Playing baseball with the New York Mets
Losing team: Capital Edge
Reasons for loss: The women team's character was overly cartoonish and did not advertise the Dairy Queen or Blizzard Treat brand at all. While Jennifer M. and Marshawn lobbied for the Dairy Queen logo to be placed on their mascot design, the rest of the team vetoed it. The executives felt that Capital Edge had misunderstood Dairy Queen's target market, as their target was teenagers and young adults, whereas Capital Edge's character seemed to be aimed at children.
Boardroom tension: Felisha seemed to be in serious danger early in the boardroom, after she was deemed to be a weak leader and could not effectively defend herself from George and Carolyn's criticism of her decisions, which included the poorly designed costume and lack of branding. Toral then spoke up and criticised Felisha for trying to get her to dress up as their character, saying that she considered such a request offensive because of her cultural beliefs, but the other women told Trump that Toral had said no such thing during the task, effectively shifting everything to her. Toral then tried to justify her failure to step up as project manager by saying that Felisha had claimed to be a marketing genius, but Felisha and the others denied that. Compounding her situation, Toral also unwittingly insulted Trump by saying that no serious businessperson would dress up in a silly costume, causing Trump to point out several occasions (including a Saturday Night Live appearance) when he had done such a thing.
Sent to boardroom: No final boardroom – while Trump considered Felisha to be primarily responsible for the loss, he was so angered at Toral's excuses and failure to perform, especially since she was educated at Wharton, a school which he regards highly ( as he attended Wharton himself ), that he fired her instead, and on the spot. 
Fired: Toral Mehta – for making an excessive number of excuses as to why she hadn't stepped up in any regard to the task, not living up to Rebecca's promises, and being a generally ineffective and divisive force in her team.
Notes:
Rebecca asked Toral to step up as Project Manager after the previous episode's boardroom, but Toral still refused to do so, resulting in Rebecca reluctantly saying that Toral should be fired when Trump asked her opinion.
Toral not only did nothing in this task, but she also procrastinated during the costume presentation phase, including, but not limited to, not giving Felisha a hard reason why she can't wear the costume. She also disassociated herself from the result, saying the team deserved to lose, but Marshawn strongly pointed out that Toral didn't contribute to tasks, meaning she wasn't a part of wins or losses.
Although Kristi wasn't polite throughout the task, she, alongside Alla, Jennifer M. and Felisha asked Toral to wear the costume, but Toral refused to do so, not only because the costume was poorly designed, but also for personal reasons (including but not limited to her religious beliefs), however she didn't bring up the hard reasons why she can't wear "silly-designed costumes" to her colleagues prior to both the presentation and before the boardroom.
After the firing, Trump expressed huge disappointment at Toral, feeling she should've been one of the stronger candidates due to her intelligence, but hated how she never stepped up nor took responsibility for her actions, even when Rebecca fought for her to stay. In the end he, Carolyn, and George agreed that firing Toral was the right choice.
This was the first occasion where Trump felt so strongly that a single candidate deserved to be fired that he did so without asking the project manager who they wanted to bring back. There had been two prior candidates fired without a final boardroom, namely Elizabeth Jarosz in Season 2 and Brian McDowell in Season 3, but Trump did ask Elizabeth who she wanted to bring back before deciding that he already had enough evidence to fire her, while Brian immediately took full responsibility for the task's failure at the start of the internal review and admitted he should be fired, removing any need for a final boardroom. Both Elizabeth and Brian were the project managers themselves on both of the prior occasions, while Toral was not. 
Episode 4 Recap from NBC.com

Week 5: Lost in Space
Airdate: October 20, 2005
Sponsor: Sony Pictures
Project: The teams had to design a parade float in order to advertise for the upcoming release of the film Zathura: A Space Adventure. The winning float would be chosen by the film's director, Jon Favreau, and a Sony Pictures executive.
Judges: Donald Trump; Carolyn Kepcher; Bill Rancic
Trump Monologue Money Matters Business is all about money, money is a score card.
Corporate restruction: Randal transferred to Capital Edge to even out the teams, since the women were down to 6 members
Capital Edge project manager: Jennifer M.
Excel project manager: Brian
Winning team: Excel (Brian exempted)
Reason for victory: Despite Brian giving an awful presentation to Favreau and the Sony executive, their float was well-built and made strong use of the Zathura branding, even having an audio clip of the correct pronunciation to ensure that the film's name would be remembered by people who saw the float.
Excel's reward: A Recording Session with Wyclef Jean where the men recorded a song called "Rubble Man".
Losing team: Capital Edge
Reason for loss: Once again, Capital Edge missed the point. Their float was built to a far lower quality than their rivals' effort, most notably suffering from totally inconsistent scaling and the film's logo being placed too high up. Jennifer M. mispronounced Zathura (calling it "Zenthura") several times during the presentation, which gave the executives a very bad impression of Jennifer's team. Things were only compounded by Kristi being extremely combative and disagreeing with her team most of the time.
Initial boardroom: While Jennifer M. initially came under heavy fire from Carolyn and Bill for her bad presentation, Trump noted that there were more fundamental problems to blame for Capital Edge's loss. A discussion then arose as to whether the problem was in the float's design or in the team dynamic being disrupted, leading to the other team members telling Trump that in either case, Kristi would be the most at fault for the task failure. Jennifer M. then asked to bring back Kristi alone, which Trump agreed to.
Sent to boardroom: Jennifer M. & Kristi
Fired: Kristi Caudell – for being the originator of Capital Edge's unsuccessful concept, for being too controlling and disrupting the team's dynamic. Despite Jennifer M.'s lackluster role as Project Manager, Trump concluded that Kristi's failings and her inability to work with her team were much more at fault in the end. 
Notes:
Brian also mispronounced the film's name (as "Zarutha") during his initial meeting with Favreau. On that occasion Favreau took the error in good humor, noting that he had mispronounced the name himself early in production, and Brian decided to incorporate the audio recording as a result of this.
After the firing, Jennifer tried to apologize to Kristi for getting her fired, but Kristi quickly snapped back at her.
Instead of the usual theme at the end of the broadcast, "Rubble Man" was broadcast as the show ended.
Episode 5 Recap from NBC.com

Week 6: Take Me Out to the Boardroom
Airdate: October 27, 2005
Sponsor: Dick's Sporting Goods
Project: The teams were tasked to promote an interactive sales event based on a sport the team chooses. The winning team will be determined as to who generates the highest percentage increase in revenue of sales. Capital Edge chose golf and Excel chose baseball.
Judges: Donald Trump; Carolyn Kepcher; Bill Rancic
Corporate restructuring: Because Capital Edge lost 4 tasks (including 3 in a row), Carolyn asked each team's project manager to send three players as to who they want to move to the other team. Alla sent Jennifer M., Rebecca, and Marshawn to Excel. Josh sent Clay, Adam, and Markus to Capital Edge.
Trump Monologue Take It To The Limit A successful team has to challenge each other, push your teammates to be better performers. You don't want to drive them over the edge, but push them as close to the edge as you can.
Capital Edge project manager: Alla
Excel project manager: Josh
Winning team: Capital Edge (Alla exempt)
Reasons for victory: Every member of the team focused on sales, rather than gimmicks. Capital Edge also created a mini golf course for children, to entertain them while their parents shopped. The result was a 74% increase in sales.
Capital Edge's reward: Taking a private jet to Montauk for a fishing trip and seafood dinner on the beach.
Losing team: Excel
Reasons for loss: Excel did not have any sales point. Josh, James, Mark, and Jennifer M. dropped the ball. They were doing nothing but marketing instead of selling the products. James also wasted time and resources by setting up a batting cage that took up most of the shop floor and didn't leave any room to display the products. The only strong sellers on the team were Brian, Rebecca, and Marshawn. This resulted in Excel making sales drop 34% below average. Excel lost by a 108% margin; at the time this was the worst defeat in the history of The Apprentice.
Boardroom tension: Usually, Trump would allow the project manager to select 1–3 people to go back into the boardroom. But since Josh was responsible for the worst failure in the history of The Apprentice, Trump didn't give Josh the opportunity to do so. Instead, Trump sent Rebecca, Marshawn and Brian to the suite, as they were the only strong sellers (and Brian was exempt), leaving Josh, Jennifer M., James, and Mark for the final boardroom. Josh is criticized for allowing James and Mark to do the marketing, but Bill also questioned that Jennifer was losing the respect of him, Carolyn, and Trump.
Sent to boardroom: Josh, Jennifer M., James, Mark
Boardroom tension: Bill grilled Jennifer M. for her responsibility and the promises she didn't deliver on. Josh and Mark quickly rounded on Jennifer M., who further harmed her cause by repeatedly snapping at Carolyn and even Trump himself on further questioning. However, James did reserve some criticism for Josh, who he accused of failing to give the team enough direction. Carolyn also criticized Josh for failing as a leader and not taking any accountability for their loss as she felt he was using Jennifer M. as a scapegoat. In the end, though, Trump was disappointed at all four of them as none of them focused on selling and decided that he had no choice but to fire all four of them.
Fired:  All four of them are fired for the largest loss ever in the history of The Apprentice, plus the following additional reasons:
Josh Shaw – for having a terrible leadership quality, his inability to control his team, making blatantly poor decisions throughout the task and for blaming everything on Jennifer M.
Jennifer Murphy – for not delivering her promises, her inability to take responsibility for the loss, losing her control, acting disrespectfully towards Trump and his advisors, along with making too many excuses for her failures.
James Dillon – for building a batting cage which forced merchandise away from the display, which defied the purpose of the event and caused sales to drop drastically.
Mark Lamkin – for not selling anything, taking a back seat on the task, and for being a generally weak contributor in the process.
Notes: 
Trump fired the four final boardroom candidates all at once, by saying, "You're all fired; all four are fired! Go home. Go home." Bill assured Trump that this was the only choice Trump had, since none of the four stepped up or hit the mark correctly during the task.
This was the first time that Trump was not present to assign the teams their task or to announce the results. Carolyn sat in Trump's chair and assigned the corporate reform and the task. She and Bill called Trump to tell him the results and he expressed great shock and disappointment when Excel's results were announced.
This was only the second time where more than one person was fired in a single episode outside of the interviews. The first time was when both Wes & Maria were fired in week 11 of the second season.
This was the worst boardroom loss ever for a team on the history of The Apprentice (to be surpassed in Season 7); Capital Edge boosted sales by 74%, and Excel dropped sales by 34%. The margin was 108% and this irritated Trump, as the margin of defeat was large beyond imagination, although Trump stated that he had to do something to seriously change Capital Edge due to the bad team record (prior to this task, Capital Edge had only won the second task).
This was also the first time that none of the candidates from the final boardroom returned to the suite, because all final boardroom candidates were fired, another first in the history of The Apprentice. Trump was angry at the disastrous loss margin, and Carolyn said that she couldn't "choose one of them" (Josh for being a poor leader, Jennifer for never living up to her promises, James for building the batting cage which forced merchandise away from the display, which brought customers in but they were interested in playing instead of buying, and Mark for taking a back seat on the task), which gave Trump enough information, evidence, and reasons to conduct a mass exodus.
Before the boardroom, Josh told Mark he would bring back Jennifer M., but that he didn't want to bring back James. This worried Mark, because if Josh only brought back Jennifer M. and Trump didn't blame her for the loss, he'd have no choice but to fire Josh. Josh also thought that Brian, Rebecca, and Marshawn did an excellent job doing the sales.
Bill said Jennifer M. promised great things, but he didn't see her deliver on any of her promises, and pointed out that she "barely" evaded firing after the last task, which might have contributed to her dismissal.
 As the group was leaving the boardroom, Mark apologized to Trump for the team disappointing him, and assured him that he was better than that. Trump accepted the apology, and said that all four candidates were better than what they showed. 
After the boardroom, all four fired candidates loaded themselves and their luggage into a single waiting taxicab. During the exit interview, all four just sat awkwardly and never looked at or spoke to each other.
Episode 6 Recap from NBC.com

Week 7: Back to School
Airdate: November 3, 2005
Sponsor: The Learning Annex
Corporate restruction: Since Excel was grievously decimated after the previous boardroom, the team is given the opportunity to take a Capital Edge member, and in turn they take back Randal, who becomes the team's PM for the task.
Project: The teams had to promote a new class for the Learning Annex. Capital Edge chose Sex in the Workplace and Excel chose Stand Out to Hit the Mark.
Judges: Donald Trump; Carolyn Kepcher; George H. Ross
Trump Monologue Get To The Point Quick, short, to the point. No Games. There are only so many overs in the day, the quicker you are the more you can get done.
Capital Edge project manager: Adam
Excel project manager: Randal (Excel took him back from Capital Edge)
Winning team: Excel (Randal exempted)
Reasons for victory: Despite the subject not being exciting, Excel was very optimistic in their presentation which created a lot of positive feedback.
Excel's reward: A shopping spree at Michael Kors.
Losing team: Capital Edge
Reasons for loss: According to the guests in the presentation, the team had a terrible presentation and Clay offended the guests by making offensive comments, which ruined the class. The team was criticized for having no agenda, no flow-ideas, poor presentation, and for being boring, despite Markus' clear warnings that the chosen topic was doomed from the start.
Sent to boardroom: Adam, Clay, Markus
Fired: Markus Garrison – for not contributing much to this task, and being seen as an overall weaker competitor in the process. Despite Adam being the losing project manager, Trump felt he did do his best job with a tough subject that he choose. Trump expressed his displeasure at Clay's rude behavior and offensive comments to Jews, however he did feel that Clay had shown more potential than Markus, who did virtually nothing in comparison and didn't even attempt to help his team when he knew the plan was going to fail.
Notes:
This is the first week in which Excel had fewer members than Capital Edge, due to the decimation of the team the previous week. 
Clay calls Adam a "shy, tight Jewish boy" during the sex presentation and was immediately chastised for it by Adam and George. Clay said that Adam was discussing his not wanting to pay a lot of money on dates, and he was going with Adam's own idea. While Adam did not say that Clay was anti-Semitic, he did cite the comments as an example of Clay being obnoxious and stupid.
Markus is seen smoking a Cohiba cigar during the hours before the boardroom. The show's edit falsely presented footage to suggest he was disengaged and looking at a yo-yo during the presentation, which was actually footage filmed after the event and dishonestly spliced in to disparage Markus.  Markus challenged this and other deceptive edits during post-firing media interviews and also challenged Donald Trump to a debate, which never occurred.
Trump asked Clay whether he was a homosexual and Adam whether he had any sexual experience.  In a typical job interview, those questions should not be asked, but this is not a typical job interview.
Episode 7 Recap from NBC.com

Week 8: Store Wars
Airdate: November 10, 2005
Prologue: After the elimination of Markus, Clay just slammed the door from coming out and he was upset from his team that he got thrown under the bus by Adam, Felisha, and Alla from the boardroom. He also told Adam not to talk to him.
Sponsor: Lucasfilm and Best Buy
Project: The teams had to design an interactive display for the DVD release of Star Wars: Episode III – Revenge of the Sith and the video game release of Star Wars: Battlefront II
Trump Monologue: Loyalty A disloyal person can totally destroy an organization, if you find a disloyal person get rid of him or her immediately.
Judges: Donald Trump; Carolyn Kepcher; Bill Rancic
Capital Edge project manager: Clay
Excel project manager: Brian
Winning team: Capital Edge. The team voted that Clay should not be exempt, as they felt that Alla had done most of the key work on the project, and should have been the project manager.
Reasons for victory: Capital Edge won largely because of the miscues committed by Excel, though their display was generally immersive and well-executed, if a little generic.
Capital Edge's reward: Spending time with Bill Rancic, and touring Trump Tower at City Place in White Plains—Trump deduced the winning team needed more tutelage from a proven worker since Clay is not exempt.
Losing team: Excel
Reasons for loss: While Excel had a good concept and seem perfectly executed, the executives from Lucasfilm and Best Buy were confused about why Darth Vader was not featured in Excel's display, as he was the key character in the film (it's important to add central characters in sales display or any segments for they are one of the key focal points in marketing). This was attributed to the fact that the team missed their meeting with the executives, which Randal had arranged for 10:15AM, but which they didn't arrive at until just after 10:45AM due to Brian deciding to set out only fifteen minutes beforehand. Additionally, while Rebecca did a creditable job presenting, it was obvious that she was not fully prepared; Marshawn had initially been set to do the presentation, but backed out with less than half an hour to go.
Initial boardroom: Trump was dumbfounded that Brian could think that fifteen minutes was enough time to get across Manhattan, particularly since Brian is a resident of the Murray Hill area. Carolyn brought up the issue of why Marshawn didn't present, and Marshawn was extremely evasive upon questioning by Trump and his advisers, giving several different answers. She initially claimed that Rebecca had usurped the presenter's position from her, then changed her story and said that she voluntarily stepped down because she thought Brian could do a better job (despite his self-confessed lack of presentation experience), before finally admitting that she just didn't feel like giving the presentation. Bill accused her of abandoning her team and failing to demonstrate her primary skill of being a good public speaker, and Trump was further irked by her admission that she didn't think the task was worth taking seriously because it was "just about a store display" – Trump pointed out that most creatives would jump at the chance to produce something for a franchise as big as Star Wars.
Sent to boardroom: No "Internal Review" – Randal was exempt, Rebecca was not at all responsible for the defeat, and Trump had enough evidence to fire both of the remaining team members, due to their terrible performances without the need for a final boardroom.
Fired:
Brian Mandelbaum - for his lack of overall quality leadership and poor time management, depending too much on Randal throughout the task, missing the meeting, which was the main reason why they failed, along with a generally very poor track record over the course of the interview process.
Marshawn Evans - for refusing to do the presentation with no valid reasoning and making a variety of excuses in response for doing so, as well as for showing a lack of respect for the task. While Trump did not feel that she was to blame for the loss, her blatant dishonesty and disdain for the project as a whole was enough for him to realize she would be unsuitable for his organization.
Notes:
This is the third time that two or more people have been fired on The Apprentice. The first occurrence was in Season 2, Week 11 (Wes and Maria) and the second in Season 4, Week 6 (Josh, Jennifer M., James, and Mark).
Even though Capital Edge won, as mentioned Clay's leadership had a particularly bad reception from his teammates and Trump and his advisors felt the team's display was merely okay and that their victory mainly attributed to the fact Excel failed to meet the executives, which as seen in the earlier seasons can play a major role in the team's defeat.
This is also the second time this season that more than one person has been fired, making the event an Apprentice first. Trump actually felt Marshawn had been a strong performer and had great potential, and that Brian was the most responsible for them loss, but felt she disappointed by not doing the presentation, which even if it went poor they would've lost either way, as well with her disrespectful comments about the display. 
Unlike the previous multiple-firing in week 6, in which he fired all four of Josh, Jennifer M., James, and Mark all at once, he fired Brian and Marshawn one at a time; Brian was fired first. 
Prior to firing Brian Trump asked him if he wanted to go home and Brian declined. Trump retaliated by saying "it's only 30 blocks up the road".
As with the previous multiple-firing in week 6, both Brian and Marshawn had to share a single taxi. 
Episode 8 Recap from NBC.com

Week 9: One Hit Blunder
Airdate: November 17, 2005
Sponsor: XM Radio
Corporate shuffle: Clay asked Trump if he could move from Capital Edge to Excel because he didn't like the way Adam, Alla, and Felisha were treating him. Trump agreed, and Clay joined Randal and Rebecca.
Task: The teams had to choose an unsigned singer and create a song for them to sing. The song would be aired on XM Radio Café channel and critiqued by listeners who called in.  Capital Edge worked with Levi Kreis  and Excel worked with Jide .
Judges: Donald Trump; Carolyn Kepcher; George H. Ross
Trump Monologue Creative Balance It is a great business person that can decide between practicality and creativity. You have to strike a balance.
Capital Edge project manager: Felisha
Excel project manager: Rebecca
Winning team: Capital Edge
Reasons for win: Without Clay's negative influence Capital Edge successfully worked as a team and managed to create a pop rock song, despite the band's jazz like roots.
Capital Edge's reward: A private helicopter tour of popular New York City buildings with Trump.
Losing team: Excel
Reasons for loss: Instead of alternative rock, which XM radio specializes in, Excel decided to change genre and created a song that was not popular with the XM radio listeners. In addition, their radio channel was wrong on their marketing material poster, which Randal was responsible for. In addition Clay was very disruptive and rude to Rebecca which caused her to be stressed during presentation(an area she specializes in.)
Sent to boardroom: No final boardroom – While Trump considered all three responsible for the loss, Trump noted that Rebecca and Randall had been outstanding throughout the process, Clay was singled out for being a negative force, constantly having trouble with working with P.M.s, and was even suspected for affecting the team performance. This gave Trump enough evidence to fire him.
Fired: Clay Lee - For his very poor attitude, being a disrespectful and disruptive force, refusing to take any responsibility for his actions, and being too difficult to work with. Trump felt that all of the members of Excel were equally responsible for the loss, but ultimately fired Clay based on his history of not getting along with his project managers, along with his failure to improve in that regard on this task, especially being warned  by Trump and his advisors before this task, especially in week 7.
Notes:
Exemptions are no longer issued. Randal was the last person in Apprentice history to receive an exemption.
Clay was unhappy with Capital Edge, so he volunteered moving to Excel. Trump accepted his offer, but Clay implicated himself when Capital Edge became very ecstatic after Clay left the team, saying they would never want to work with him ever again. In the boardroom, Rebecca said she would also never want to work with Clay again, to which Randal agreed.
Both Rebecca and Randal were in serious danger of also being fired; Rebecca because this was her second loss as project manager, and Randal because Trump considered the error over the channel number to be such a basic mistake that it was grounds for instant dismissal. It was strongly implied that Randal's honesty over the error (compared to Clay's refusal to admit making any significant mistakes in the task) played a major part in his survival.
Episode 9 Recap from NBC.com

Week 10: Shaniagans
Airdate: November 24, 2005
Sponsor: Coty, Inc.
Project: The teams have to wrap an object to promote Country pop music star Shania Twain's new fragrance by Stetson. The team with the most calls and votes wins.
Judges: Donald Trump; Carolyn Kepcher; Bill Rancic
Trump Monologue Be A Gladiator There are times where the only choice is a confrontation. Confrontation is not popular, but sometimes it is needed. Do it with confidence, do it with Gusto.
Capital Edge project manager: Alla
Excel project manager: Randal
Reason for Randal being project manager: Randal felt that he needed to prove himself after he made a fatal mistake on the XM Radio task.
Megaphone heist: When Randal called Radio Shack to ask for megaphones, the assistant told him another group of people (Capital Edge) called in for megaphones. Randal and Rebecca engaged in a "Megaphone Heist".  This is the turning point of the task. Randall and Rebecca pretended to be Capital Edge's "colleagues" and went into the store to pick them up "for them". Randall and Rebecca left with only nine instead of 10 because the tenth megaphone was set up in a display window and Rebecca was nervous of Capital Edge coming in and spotting them. When Alla called to check on Capital Edge's megaphones, the receptionist told them they had already given them to Excel.
Winning team: Excel
Reasons for victory: Excel sabotaged Capital Edge's plan to reinforce the Spanish Harlem army of temps to vocalize the product with the megaphones usually that Alla and her team planned on using. As a results, ended up with 978 calls.
Excel's reward: A horseback ride through Central Park and dinner with Shania Twain.
Losing team: Capital Edge
Reasons for loss: Adam spent half of their budget working with the horse and carriages, which didn't really speak out in the streets of NYC. This forced Felisha to cut the number of temps they could hire. They came up short by five calls, resulting to only 973 calls. 
Boardroom issues: When Alla brought up Excel's Megaphone Heist caper, Trump and Bill Rancic thought Excel was smart and approved of it. Carolyn felt that if Felisha would have hired one or two temps, chances are Capital Edge would have gotten a victory.
Before verdict: Trump sent Alla back to the suite since she's not liable for this loss and being in the boardroom for the final verdict.
Sent to boardroom: Adam and Felisha
Firing points: Trump asked both Bill and Carolyn whom they should fire. Carolyn first said they were both equally weak on this task, but she wanted Felisha to be fired due to her failure to hire more temps. Bill thought Adam deserved to be fired for his lack of contributions over the last six weeks, along with his mistakes on this task.
Fired: Adam Israelov, for terrible decision-making and spending 70% of his team's budget on horse and carriages that looked awful and ineffective. Felisha was also felt to be responsible for her terrible contribution for not hiring enough temps, but Trump agreed what Bill said and fired Adam instead for not making a stronger case how he's better than Felisha. Trump also felt Felisha and Alla make a much stronger team together.
Notes:
In the boardroom, Alla brought up Randall and Rebecca taking the megaphones in hopes that Trump would take that into considering.  However, both Trump and Bill commended Randall and Rebecca for that.
Alla is the first and only project manager (to date) not to face the boardroom, since Trump did not consider her responsible for the loss.
In the final boardroom, Carolyn said that Adam and Felisha were easily the weakest of the final five, which offended Felisha.
As this episode aired on Thanksgiving weekend, a one-hour highlight package of previously unaired footage and a summary was shown.
The Internal Review of the Execs was performed immediately after Alla was sent back to the suite; as in the final moments of Chris from The Apprentice 3, the candidates had to remain in the boardroom although it counted as an internal review.
As a result, Randal won the task with his third victory as Project Manager.
Episode 10 Recap from NBC.com

Week 11: To Lead or Not to Lead
Airdate: December 1, 2005
Sponsor: Microsoft
Project: The teams had to direct a commercial promoting Microsoft's Live Meeting program.
Judges: Donald Trump; Carolyn Kepcher; Bill Rancic
Trump Monologue Family Family is very important in business, over the years Trump has seen many successful people who have a lot going but they aren't necessarily happy. The people who are most content are the ones with good family. 
Capital Edge project manager: Felisha
Excel project manager: Rebecca
Winning team: Excel
Reasons for win: Microsoft loved the story-themed concept and Rebecca and Randal's roles in the commercial (Rebecca hired actors, but they weren't good at showing emotional feelings, so she and Randal took over so they could avoid a time crunch). In addition they showcased many of the program's features, including the brand messaging.
Excel's reward: A private sailboat ride around New York City
Throughout the private sailboat ride, Randal received a surprise visit by his wife Zahara, and Rebecca received a surprise visit by her boyfriend Matt.
Trump chose the Private Sailboat Ride as the reward mainly because he believed that Excel needed to "relax".
Losing team: Capital Edge
Reasons for loss: Although Capital Edge had great brand messaging, their story line was a bit complex to follow through the commercial. Plus, the executives didn't hold their attention of the program's features when the commercial had too much text going at once (i.e. the visual texts went too fast), which gave them a difficult impression to follow. In the end, they focused on creating visual effects, as opposed to communicating to the people in using the program of Microsoft Live Meeting. Trump felt this wasn't even close. During the boardroom, Carolyn described the commercial as having too much information, and Bill criticized them for chopping & cutting the commercial up, as a "catastrophic mistake".
Sent to boardroom: No internal review
Fired: Both of them were fired, for the following reasons:
Felisha Mason, for not being emotionally strong enough to handle the tough and cutthroat acumen of New York City, her lack of overall quality leadership, and for losing control of Alla.
Alla Wartenburg, for her insubordination, and for producing and directing a horrid Microsoft Live Meeting commercial, along with brutally attacking Felisha in the boardroom.
Notes:
This is the third multiple-firing conducted this season.
Season four had the most multiple-firings in one season of The Apprentice ever (all multiple-firings were unannounced).
This is the first time the finalists have been decided by an unannounced multiple-firing alone before the one-on-one interviews with the four prominent executives.
This is the second time in the series that Trump fired every candidate in the boardroom at the time. The first time was in week 6, when he fired all four of Excel's members (Josh, Jennifer M., James, and Mark). 
Unlike the week 6 multiple-firing, and similar to the week 8 multiple-firing, Trump fired Felisha and Alla one at a time; Felisha was fired first. 
Capital Edge is the first team in the history of The Apprentice to be completely out of business before the one-on-one interviews, because there are no more Capital Edge members.
The turning point during this task was when Felisha and Alla butt heads during the acting part of the task, where Felisha failed to halt Alla's insubordination.
Right after Felisha was fired, Alla was about to escape from the boardroom, and Trump told her to sit back down and fired her as well.
During the boardroom, Alla and Felisha, again, argue, causing Felisha to break into tears.  This occurred despite their supposed friendship.  Trump told Alla that she was unmanageable, citing that Alla acts like a bully even though Felisha is nice to her. Felisha was the only one expected to be fired, but when Alla attempted to escape from the boardroom right after Felisha was fired, Trump told her to sit back down and fired her as well. Ironically, prior to the boardroom, Felisha had given serious consideration to resigning rather than allowing herself to be fired, as she did not think Trump was likely to fire Alla, but Alla's verbal attacks motivated Felisha into defending herself.
After the boardroom, Trump went back upstairs to the suite to inform Randal and Rebecca that they are the Final Two. 
As with the previous two multiple-firings in week 6 and week 8, both Felisha and Alla had to share a single taxi. 
After the task, and before the Boardroom, Randal had a 7–4 record in the 11 tasks.  The women were 4–7 a piece.  Alla was 1–1 as Project Manager, Felisha and Rebecca were 1–2 each. Randal had the best record with 3–0.
Normally, when there's only three or four candidates remaining, there would be an interview process in which Trump (at the behest of the executives) determines whether or not a candidate would be eligible to participate in the final task. For this season, when there was four candidates left, Trump decided to do a regular task, and save the interview week for when there were only three candidates remaining, but this season, there won't be an interview week since the number of candidates went down from four straight to two, as Trump fired both of the losing team's remaining team members. 
This is the first time that two candidates that were interrupted by reward-related injuries and family-related issues refused to quit, even though they were offered a chance to do so.
Both commercials are available at Microsoft's official Live Meeting webpage
Episode 11 Recap from NBC.com

Week 12: The Final Showdown
Airdate: December 8, 2005
Sponsor: Yahoo! and Outback Steakhouse
Finalists: Rebecca and Randal
Judges: Donald Trump; Carolyn Kepcher; George H. Ross
Task Dossier for Rebecca: Work with Yahoo! to host a comedy event raising money for the Elizabeth Glaser Pediatric AIDS Foundation.
Rebecca's Recruits: Chris, James, and Toral
Task Dossier for Randal: Work with Outback Steakhouse to host a celebrity softball tournament for Autism Speaks.
Randal's Recruits: Josh, Mark, and Marshawn
Notes:
There are no more teams from this point on— Randal and Rebecca are on their own.
Corporation names were used in the final task for the first time in Apprentice history—previously no corporation names would be used on the Final Task
Capital Edge "re-opened for business under new ownership and management"—with Rebecca as the sole candidate of the corporation
Randal is now the sole candidate of Excel, even though in the last task team names would not be used
Because Trump fired both Felisha and Alla at the end of Week 11, Season 4 is the first season that does not require one-on-one interviews with the prominent executives.
This is the first time that Donald visited the candidates' suite on camera in lieu of declaring both Randal and Rebecca The Final Two.
As opposed to Season 3 which recruits were assigned, Randal and Rebecca were allowed to choose their recruits. Randal had originally chosen Josh, James and Mark, while Rebecca chose Josh, James and Chris.  Rebecca and Randal compromised that she could have James and he would get Josh.  Randal then decided the wanted Chris as well, so they flipped a coin and Rebecca "won" Chris.  Then Rebecca chose Toral and Randal chose Marshawn for their third recruit.
As recalled from Season 1 of The Apprentice, Bill Rancic and Kwame Jackson were allowed to choose their teams, but they were only allowed to choose among the last six fired candidates from that season (Amy, Katrina, and Nick for Bill and Heidi, Omarosa, and Troy for Kwame).
For this season, Randal and Rebecca could choose from any of the 16 already-fired candidates, regardless of what position they finished in.
As promised, the tasks were quite challenging, with obstacles that included executives threatening to pull out from the event planning project, acts of God (there was a thunderstorm and a very loud lightning flash shown at the end of the episode), and the need to entirely rejigger the venue.
After Trump fired Felisha and Alla, he went up to the suite and told Randal and Rebecca to meet George and Carolyn at a restaurant. Trump told both to enjoy themselves because he promised "the last task would be hell".
Both Randal and Rebecca reserved the right to re-fire any recruits should for any reason the recruits displease either of them.
Episode 12 Recap from NBC.com

Week 13: Decision Time
Airdate: December 15, 2005
Preface: Aired live at the Alice Tully Hall within the Lincoln Center limits at New York City before a televised audience, with the remainder of the final task pre-recorded
Project: Picks up from where the obstacles started to ensue from Week 12
Weather was a threat for Randal—Randal had no choice but to hold the event indoors, not just because of the rain, but because the cold weather as well.
Desertion was a threat for Rebecca—Rebecca was forced to utilize a Plan B.
Outcome:
Rebecca hired a new comedian, but fails to raise money for the Elizabeth Glaser AIDS Foundation
Randal forced the charity event inside.  He failed to check the weather and used cramped space, but raised money for Autism Speaks.
Boardroom: Each of the six recruits get to discuss their bosses, then both Randal and Rebecca had to defend their performance in the final boardroom.
Decision: Aired live before a televised audience
Toral defended Rebecca since Rebecca did the same for Toral, Trump replied that Toral better defend Rebecca since Rebecca worked really hard for Toral. Trump also stated he agreed with Toral for the first time (he fired Toral on the spot in week 4, see above).
Marshawn was the most impartial of the "opinion board"—she gave neutral reasons why Randal should be hired.
While Jennifer M. said she really liked Rebecca, Jen M. preferred Randal citing Randal's natural-born leader tendencies.
Alla said she preferred Randal and accused Rebecca of being the weakest link. Alla said she saw nothing in Rebecca.
Fired: Rebecca Jarvis mainly for her donation method.
Although it appeared that Randal was Trump's first choice, Rebecca seemed to be a close second choice until Randal made a controversial comment that Trump should not hire Rebecca.
Hired: Randal Pinkett for raising $11,000 for Autism Speaks.
What is next for Randal: Renovation of the chain of Trump Casinos at Atlantic City.
Notes:
As with season three, the two projects were described prior to Trump's decision; in seasons one and two, they were always presented to the hiree after he or she was crowned.  Trump asked each finalist which project they would choose if they were hired.
Choice 1 was the Trump Casino renovation spree at Atlantic City (Chosen by Randal)
Choice 2 was the Trump Tower project at Jersey City, New Jersey (Chosen by Rebecca)
A  twist at the end was that Trump asked Randal if he would also hire Rebecca into the Trump organization, an Apprentice first.
Although Trump said he could have been convinced that Rebecca should also be hired, Randal recommended that Trump rescind that idea, citing that the premise of the "ultimate job interview" was to hire "only one candidate," not two; Randal suggested that hiring Rebecca would prompt the show's name to be changed into "The Apprenti".
At Randal's recommendation, Trump rescinded what could have been the first multiple-hiring and a US Apprentice first. Throughout the following week, many were critical of Randal's decision. In an interview with Larry King, Randal defended his decision and said he had no objection to Trump hiring Rebecca at a later date.
Series web sponsor Yahoo!, to make up for discouraging Rebecca from requesting donations during the task (although Rebecca could have held other fundraising events, such as a silent auction), opted to raise money for the Elizabeth Glaser AIDS Foundation through their website.  They also pledged $50,000 to both charities presented on the show.
On The Today Show after the finale, Rebecca received an offer from Wenda Millard (one of the Yahoo! associates who oversaw Rebecca's final task) to write for Yahoo! Finance.  The show's official Web site is held at Yahoo!
Rebecca appeared at the final boardroom without crutches, as it was clearly evident the entire series had been taped in a span of 45 days, and she had completely recovered from the injury by the December live final.
Heidi Bressler from the 1st season covered the finale for Fox Reality Channel and conducted interviews with Carolyn Kepcher and Donald Trump. In the former, Carolyn was amused by Heidi's declaration that the women didn't like Rebecca and didn't want her to defeat Randall; in the latter, Trump told Heidi about the future of the show, breaking the news that after a 5th season in NYC the 6th season would take place in Los Angeles. Jennifer Oberting (née Crisafulli) from Season 2 briefly appeared on camera because she was hanging out with Heidi during the event, but Trump was visibly unhappy on seeing her, and actually moved where he was standing during his chat with Heidi so that his position blocked Jennifer out of the scene's frame.
Episode 13 Recap from NBC.com

References

External links
NBC official site
Yahoo!'s Apprentice 4 site
The Apprentice Rules 
EW.com – "Famous Last Words"
Transcript from Larry King Live on Apprentice controversy
Realityblurred.com – Randal's choice
"Josh Shaw: Fired. Exclusive interview with College Crier"

2005 American television seasons
04